Hassan Moaffi (1931 – 22 November 1975) was an Egyptian sports shooter. He competed in the trap event at the 1960 Summer Olympics.

References

1931 births
1975 deaths
Egyptian male sport shooters
Olympic shooters of Egypt
Shooters at the 1960 Summer Olympics
Sportspeople from Alexandria
20th-century Egyptian people